SKIF Krasnodar is a team handball club from Krasnodar, Russia. SKIF Krasnodar competes in the Russian Handball Super League.

History
The club was established in Krasnodar, in the distant 1963, and at different times called the "Thunderbird", "University", "Skif", "Arcadia SKIF", "SKIF-Rosneft", "SKIF- Kuban". The first team coach was honored coach of Russia Vitaly Sorokin. Professional status of the team received in 1964, in the major league championship of the USSR.

In reaction to the 2022 Russian invasion of Ukraine, the International Handball Federation banned Russian athletes, and the European Handball Federation suspended the  Russian clubs from competing in European handball competitions.

Accomplishments
Russian Cup
2017
Soviet Union Handball League
1991, 1992
EHF Cup: 1
1990
Limburgse Handbal Dagen
1990

References

External links
 Official website

Russian handball clubs
Sports clubs in Krasnodar